John Straley (born 1953) is a poet and author of detective fiction.  He currently resides in Sitka, Alaska.

Biography
John Straley was born in Redwood City, California. He grew up in the Seattle area and attended high school in New York City. Straley trained, with encouragement from his parents, to be a horseshoer. He attended Grinnell College before transferring to the University of Washington for a degree in writing. After college and a stint in Eastern Washington, he followed his wife to Sitka, Alaska in 1977. After moving through a number of jobs he became a private investigator.  In 1985, he became a staff investigator for the Alaska Public Defender's office in Sitka, a position he held until 2015.  As an investigator, he continued to write. After being turned down by publishers numerous times, in 1991 he received a tip from friend and anthropologist Richard Nelson that New York City-based Soho Press was interested in detective fiction novels. Upon submitting his manuscript for The Woman Who Married a Bear, Soho Press expressed interest in his work. After a successful run of mysteries that has garnered critical acclaim, he is now looking outside of his trademark Cecil Younger series for future books.

During his presidency, Bill Clinton visited a bookstore and bought The Woman Who Married a Bear.

In 2006, he was named writer laureate for the State of Alaska; he served in that position until 2008.

In 2008, Alaska Northwest Books published Straley's The Big Both Ways, a historical fiction work based in the Pacific Northwest.  Since then his work has been primarily in creating poetry.

In 2014, SOHO Press published Straley's latest book, Cold Storage, Alaska.

Straley will return to the Cecil Younger series, with the first book since 2001, with the release of Baby's First Felony, in July 2018 (Soho Press).

Bibliography

Cecil Younger series
 The Woman Who Married a Bear (1992)—winner of the 1993 Shamus Award
 The Curious Eat Themselves (1993)
 The Music of What Happens (1996)—winner of the Spotted Owl Award
 Death and the Language of Happiness (1997)
 The Angels Will not Care (1998)
 Cold Water Burning (2001)
 Baby's First Felony (2018)

Later books
 The Big Both Ways (2008)
 The Rising and the Rain (2008)
 Cold Storage, Alaska (2014)

Other writing
 Short stories:
 "Life Before the War"—published in Men from Boys
 "Finding Lou"—published in The Mysterious North
 Essays:
 Published in The Nation, Alaska magazine
 "Love, Crime and Joyriding on a Dead-End Road"—published in The Book of the Tongass (1999)

References

External links
 Official site
 SOHO Press | Author Page

1953 births
20th-century American novelists
21st-century American novelists
American male novelists
American mystery writers
Living people
People from Redwood City, California
People from Sitka, Alaska
Poets Laureate of Alaska
Shamus Award winners
University of Washington alumni
Writers from Alaska
Writers from Seattle
20th-century American poets
21st-century American poets
American male poets
Poets from Alaska
20th-century American male writers
21st-century American male writers
Novelists from California
Novelists from Washington (state)